The land of Provence has a history quite separate from that of any of the larger nations of Europe. Its independent existence has its origins in the frontier nature of the dukedom in Merovingian Gaul. In this position, influenced and affected by several different cultures on different sides, the Provençals maintained a unity which was reinforced when the region was made a separate kingdom during the Carolingian decline of the later ninth century. Provence was eventually joined to the other Burgundian kingdom, but it remained ruled by its own powerful, and largely independent, counts.

In the eleventh century, Provence became disputed between the traditional line and the counts of Toulouse, who claimed the title of "Margrave of Provence". In the High Middle Ages, the title of Count of Provence belonged to local families of Frankish origin, to the House of Barcelona, to the House of Anjou and to a cadet branch of the House of Valois. After 1032, the county was part of the Holy Roman Empire. It was inherited by King Louis XI of France in 1481, and definitively incorporated into the French royal domain by his son Charles VIII in 1487.

Merovingian governors
During the period of the Merovingian dynasty in Gaul, Provence was a province ruled by duces (dukes), military leaders and district commanders who served as defenders of the frontiers of the kingdom and ruled over vast territories as opposed to the comites (counts), who ruled the cities and their environs. Provence was usually a part of the division of the Frankish realm known as the Kingdom of Burgundy, which was treated as its own kingdom. Their title sometimes appears as rector Provinciae.

This is an incomplete list of the known Merovingian-appointed dukes of Provence.

Liberius (until 534), Ostrogothic appointee
Namatius (bef. 552), Frankish appointee
Bodegisel (fl. c. 566)
Adovarius (561–569)
Lupus (569–570)
Jovin (570–573)
Albin (573–575)
Dinamius (from 575)
Gondulf (fl. c. 581)
Leudegisel (fl. c. 585), of Burgundian Provence
Nicetas (from 587)
Babo (fl. c. 600)
Aegyla (fl. c. 602)
Bado (634–641)
Willibad (641–643), of Burgundian Provence
Hector (fl. c. 679)
Nemfidius (fl. c. 700)
Antenor (fl. c. 697)
Metrannus (fl. c. 700)
Maurontus (c. 720 – 739)
Abbo (fl. c. 739)

Carolingian dukes
Provence was ruled by a poorly known series of dukes during the period of general Carolingian unity until the Treaty of Verdun (843).

Leibulf (until c. 829)
Guerin (c. 829 – 845)
Fulcrad (845 – c. 860)

Carolingian kings
After the division of the Carolingian Empire by the Treaty of Verdun (843), the first of the fraternal rulers of the three kingdoms to die was Lothair I, who divided his middle kingdom in accordance with the custom of the Franks between his three sons. Out of this division came the Kingdom of Provence, given to Lothair's youngest son, Charles. A heritage of royal rule was thus inaugurated in Provence which, though it was often subsumed into one of its larger neighbouring kingdoms, was just as often proclaiming its own sovereigns.

The kingdom of Provence was also known as Lower Burgundy (or Cisjurane Burgundy). Its capital was first Vienne then Arles.

Charles of Provence (855–863)On his death, Provence divided between surviving brothers, Lothair II and the Emperor Louis II. The bulk goes to Louis.
Louis II (863–875), also Holy Roman Emperor from 855On his death, as with his Kingdom of Italy, Louis's Provence goes to his uncle Charles the Bald .
Charles the Bald (875–877), also Holy Roman Emperor from 875
Louis the Stammerer (877–879)With the death of Louis the Stammerer, Provence refused to elect his two sons and instead elected one of their own as king. Boso married Ermengard, daughter of Louis II, to strengthen his and his son's claim.
Boso (879–887)
Louis the Blind (887–928), also Holy Roman Emperor from 901 to 905Louis's kingdom did not pass to his heirs, but instead to his brother-in-law, the husband of his sister, Hugh, who had acted as his regent since 905. Hugh never used the royal title in Provence.
Hugh (911–933)In 933, Provence ceases to be a separate kingdom as Hugh exchanged it with Rudolph II of Upper Burgundy for the Iron Crown of Lombardy, that is, rule of Italy.

Counts and Margraves, within the Empire
In the aftermath of the death of Louis the Blind, Provence began to be ruled by local counts placed under the authority of a margrave. Firstly, Hugh of Arles served as duke and regent during Louis' long blindness. Secondly, Hugh gave the march of Vienne and duchy of Provence to Rudolf II of Burgundy in a treaty of 933. Rudolf was never recognised by the nobles of the country and appointed Hugh, Duke of Burgundy as its first margrave.

At the time, the premier counts in the region were the counts of Arles and those of Avignon. Those who would first bear the title comes Provinciae or "count of Provence" descended from one Rotbold of Arles. William I and Rotbold I did not divide their father's domains and this indivisibility was maintained by their respective descendants. It is thus impossible to ascertain who succeeded whom in the county as various reigns overlap.

By his marriage to Emma of Provence, daughter of Rotbold II, William III, Count of Toulouse inherited lands and castles in Provence. Emma inherited the title Margrave of Provence upon her elder brother's death in 1037. Her son Pons by William III did not survive her, but her grandson did and claimed her title in opposition to the younger line of counts of Provence.

Bosonid dynasty

House of Gévaudan

Houses of Barcelona (comital) and Toulouse (margravial)

With a lack of interest in the Reconquista on their southern frontier, the Catalans turned towards their origins, the Mediterranean littoral and northwards. They coveted the region between the Cévennes and the Rhône, then under the control of Toulouse. In 1112, the count of Barcelona, Ramon Berenguer III, married the heiress of Provence, Douce, who was the daughter of the Countess Gerberga of Provence, Gévaudan, Carladais, and part of Rodez. The marriage was probably taken at the urging of the church, which was then in conflict with the House of Toulouse. In 1076, Count Raymond IV was excommunicated, but he still lent his support to Aicard, the deposed archbishop of Arles (since 1080). With the count away on the First Crusade, the church took the opportunity to seize the balance of power in the region. This marriage effectively put Provence under Catalan control.

To accommodate the longstanding claims of the count of Toulouse, in 1125, Raymond's heir, Alfonso Jordan, signed a treaty whereby his family's traditional claim to the title of "Margrave of Provence" was recognised and the march of Provence was defined as the region north of the lower Durance and on the right of the Rhône, including the castles of Beaucaire, Vallabrègues, and Argence. The region between the Durance, the Rhône, the Alps, and the sea was that of the county and belonged to the house of Barcelona. Avignon, Pont de Sorgues, Caumont and Le Thor remained undivided.

Internally, Provence was racked by uncertainties over rights of succession. Douce and Ramon Berenguer signed all charters jointly until her death in 1127, after which he alone appears as count in all charters until his death in 1131. At that time, Douce's younger sister, Stephanie was married to Raymond of Baux, who promptly laid claim to the inheritance of her mother, even though Provence had peacefully passed into the hands of her nephew, Berenguer Ramon I.

Capetian Angevin dynasty
1246–1285 Charles I, Count of Anjou, Maine, Provence and Forcalquier (1246), King of Naples, Sicily (1266) and Jerusalem (1277).
1285–1309 Charles II of Naples the Lame, King of Naples and (nominal) Jerusalem and Sicily, son of Charles I
1309–1343 Robert of Naples the Wise, Duke of Calabria (1296–1309), King of Naples and (nominal) Jerusalem and Sicily (1309), son of Charles II
1343–1382 Joan I of Naples, Queen of Naples and (nominal) Jerusalem and Sicily (1343–1381)
1349–1362 Louis I of Naples, King of Naples and (nominal) Jerusalem and Sicily, as husband of Joan I of Naples
Queen Joan died heirless, leaving the county to Louis I of Anjou, son of King John II of France the Good, of the House of Valois, and great-great-grandson of Charles II of Naples.

Valois-Anjou dynasty
1382–1384 Louis I of Anjou, Count and then Duke of Anjou (1351), Duke of Calabria and Count of Maine (1356), Duke of Touraine (1370), nominal King of Sicily (1382)
1384–1417 Louis II of Anjou, Duke of Anjou, Calabria and Touraine, Count of Maine, nominal King of Sicily (1384), Count of Guise (1404), son of Louis I
1417–1434 Louis III of Anjou, Duke of Anjou and Touraine, nominal King of Sicily (1417), Duke of Calabria (1424), son of Louis II
1434–1480 René I of Naples the Good, Count of Guise (1417–1422), Duke of Lorraine and Bar (1431), King of Naples and (nominal) Sicily and Jerusalem (1434–1442), Duke of Anjou and Touraine (1434), King of Aragon and Count of Barcelona (in dispute, 1466–1472), son of Louis II
1480–1481 Charles III (V of Maine), also known as Charles of Maine, Count of Maine and Guise (1472), nephew of René I

Upon his death, the heirless Charles du Maine bequeathed the counties of Provence-Forcalquier to King Louis XI of France. From that point forward, the title of Count of Provence simply became one of the many hereditary titles of the French monarchs. The only time the title was used independently afterwards was by the future Louis XVIII of France, who was known as the Comte de Provence until the death of his nephew Louis XVII in 1795, after which he claimed the throne of France.

Governors and grand seneschals, within France

Governors
1481–1483 	Palamède de Forbin
1491–1493

Grand seneschals
1480–1481 	Pierre de La Jaille (see Château de Ranton)
1482–1483 	Raymond de Glandevès-Faucon
1483 	Palamède de Forbin
1485–1493	Aymar de Poitiers, Count of Valentinois

Governors – grand seneschals
1493–1503 	Philip of Hachberg-Sausenberg, margrave de Hochberg
1504–1513 	Louis d'Orléans, Count of Longueville
1514 	Jean de Poitiers, lord of Saint-Vallier
1515–1525 	René of Savoy, Count of Tende
1525–1566 	Claude de Savoie, Count of Tende
1566–1572 	Honoré de Savoie, Count of Tende

Grand seneschals
1572–1582 	, Count of Carcès
1582–1610 	, Count of Carcès
1610–1655 	Jean de Pontevès, Count of Carcès
1655–1662 	-Gordes

Governors
1572–1573 	Gaspard de Saulx-Tavannes
1573–1578 	Albert de Gondi, comte de Retz
1578–1579 	François de La Baume, comte de Suze
1579–1586 	Henri d'Angoulême, called, Henri, bâtard de Valois
1586–1594 	Jean-Louis de Nogaret, duc d'Épernon
1592–1594 	Gaspard de Pontevès, comte de Carcès
1594–1631 	Charles de Lorraine, duc de Guise
1631–1637 	Nicolas de L'Hôpital, marquis de Vitry
1637–1653 	Louis-Emmanuel de Valois, comte d'Alais
1653–1669 	Louis de Bourbon-Vendôme, duc de Mercœur
1669–1712 	Louis-Joseph de Bourbon, duc de Vendôme
1712–1734 	Claude-Louis-Hector, duc de Villars
1734–1770 	Honoré-Armand, duc de Villars
1770–1780 	Camille-Louis de Lorraine
1780–1790 	Charles-Just de Beauvau

In 1790, the French Revolution definitively ended the governorship.

See also 
 List of consorts of Provence

References

External links 
GENEALOGY.EU: RULERS OF PROVENCE
Titles of counts of Provence

Rulers
Lists of French nobility
Francia
Lists of European rulers
Dukedoms of France
Lists of dukes